The 1972 E3 Harelbeke was the 15th edition of the E3 Harelbeke cycle race and was held on 25 March 1972. The race started and finished in Harelbeke. The race was won by Hubert Hutsebaut.

General classification

References

1972 in Belgian sport
1972
1972 in road cycling